Umberto Gerli (4 December 1925 – 3 March 2006) was an Italian ice hockey player. He competed in the men's tournament at the 1948 Winter Olympics.

References

1925 births
2006 deaths
Italian ice hockey players
Olympic ice hockey players of Italy
Ice hockey players at the 1948 Winter Olympics
Ice hockey people from Milan